Oscar Turner (February 3, 1825 – January 22, 1896) was a U.S. Representative from Kentucky, father of Oscar Turner.

Born in New Orleans, Louisiana, Turner moved with his parents to Fayette County, Kentucky, in 1826.
He completed preparatory studies.
He moved to Ballard County, Kentucky, in 1843.
He was graduated from the law department of Transylvania University, Lexington, Kentucky, in 1847.
Commonwealth attorney 1851–1855.
He was admitted to the bar and practiced until 1861.
He served in the Kentucky State Senate 1867–1871.

Turner was elected as an Independent Democrat to the Forty-sixth Congress, as a Democrat to the Forty-seventh Congress, and as an Independent Democrat to the Forty-eighth Congress (March 4, 1879 – March 3, 1885).
He resumed the practice of law.
He died in Louisville, Kentucky, on January 22, 1896.
He was interred in Cave Hill Cemetery.

References

External links

1825 births
1896 deaths
Transylvania University alumni
Kentucky lawyers
Burials at Cave Hill Cemetery
Politicians from New Orleans
Kentucky Independents
Independent Democrat members of the United States House of Representatives
Democratic Party members of the United States House of Representatives from Kentucky
Lawyers from New Orleans
19th-century American politicians
19th-century American lawyers
Kentucky state senators